Sayeda Rubina Akter (6 March 1975), also known by her daak naam Meera, is a Bangladesh Awami League politician and the Member of the Bangladesh Parliament from a reserved seat. She is a member of the standing committee on the aviation ministry.

Early life and education
Akter was born on 6 March 1975, to a Bengali Muslim family from Wazirpur, Barisal District. Her father, Sayed Monower Hossain, was a Syed, claiming descent from Ali, the fourth Caliph of Islam. She studied at the University of Dhaka. Akter is married to Musharraf Hossain Sardar, former elected GS of Shahid Sergeant Zahurul Haq Hall and former assistant editor of the Awami League Sub-Committee.

Career
Akter was elected to parliament from reserved seat as a Bangladesh Awami League candidate in 2019.

References

Awami League politicians
Living people
Women members of the Jatiya Sangsad
9th Jatiya Sangsad members
21st-century Bangladeshi women politicians
21st-century Bangladeshi politicians
1975 births
University of Dhaka alumni
Bangladeshi people of Arab descent